Events from the year 1985 in Kuwait.

Incumbents
 Emir: Jaber Al-Ahmad Al-Jaber Al-Sabah
 Prime Minister: Saad Al-Salim Al-Sabah

Events

Births
 5 January - Bader Al-Mutawa.
 16 February - Khaled Al Qahtani.
 26 February - Fahad Awadh.
 12 March - Ali Al Kandari.

References

 
Kuwait
Kuwait
Years of the 20th century in Kuwait
1980s in Kuwait